Magdalen Gate railway station was located on the line between  and Watlington. It served the parish of Wiggenhall St Mary Magdalen, and closed in 1866.
Nothing remains of the station.

References

Former Great Eastern Railway stations
Railway stations in Great Britain opened in 1848
Railway stations in Great Britain closed in 1866
Disused railway stations in Norfolk